The following is a list of notable deaths in May 2017.

Entries for each day are listed alphabetically by surname. A typical entry lists information in the following sequence:
 Name, age, country of citizenship at birth, subsequent country of citizenship (if applicable), what subject was noted for, cause of death (if known), and reference.

May 2017

1
Anatoly Aleksin, 92, Russian writer and poet.
Richard Basciano, 91, American property developer.
Katy Bødtger, 84, Danish singer, natural causes.
Raul Costa Seibeb, 25, Namibian racing cyclist, winner of the National Road Race Championship (2014), traffic collision.
Yisrael Friedman, 93, Israeli rabbi and educator.
Pierre Gaspard-Huit, 99, French film director and screenwriter.
Roy Gater, 76, English footballer (Port Vale, Bournemouth & Boscombe Athletic, Crewe Alexandra), Alzheimer's disease.
Eugene Gendlin, 90, Austrian-born American philosopher.
Kurt Grönholm, 90, Finnish Olympic rower (1952).
Bruce Hampton, 70, American musician (Hampton Grease Band, Aquarium Rescue Unit) and actor (Sling Blade).
Erkki Kurenniemi, 75, Finnish musician.
Alice Langtry, 84, American politician, member of the Pennsylvania House of Representatives (1985–1992).
Yuri Lobanov, 64, Tajik sprint canoeist, Olympic champion (1972).
Mike Lowry, 78, American politician, Governor of Washington (1993–1997) and U.S. Representative from Washington's 7th congressional district (1979–1989), complications from a stroke.
Sam Mele, 95, American baseball player (Boston Red Sox, Washington Senators) and manager (Minnesota Twins), natural causes.
Janet Pilgrim, 82, American model (Playboy).
Karel Schoeman, 77, South African novelist, apparent suicide by dehydration.
Sterling Seagrave, 80, American investigative journalist and author.
Eduard Sekler, 96, Austrian architect and architectural historian.
Betty Shannon, 95, American mathematician.
Mohamed Talbi, 95, Tunisian historian.
Stanley Weston, 84, American licensing agent and inventor of the action figure, creator of G.I. Joe and ThunderCats, complications from surgery.

2
John Bahen, 73, Australian footballer (Fitzroy).
Vincent Baggetta, 72, American actor (The Eddie Capra Mysteries).
Harold Bedoya Pizarro, 78, Colombian military officer and politician, commander of the National Army (1994–1996), lymphoma.
Michael Bore, 69, English cricketer (Yorkshire, Nottinghamshire).
Abelardo Castillo, 82, Argentine writer.
Cammy Duncan, 51, Scottish footballer (Motherwell, Partick Thistle, Ayr United), cancer.
Michael Gurr, 55, Australian playwright (Departure).
Hugo Judd, 77, Canadian-born New Zealand diplomat.
Heinz Kessler, 97, German politician and military officer, East German Minister of National Defence (1985–1989).
Toby Kimball, 74, American basketball player (Boston Celtics, San Diego Rockets, New Orleans Jazz), inflammatory lung disease.
Diane Lewis, 65, American architect, author and academic.
Paul MacEwan, 74, Canadian politician.
Gerry Martiniuk, 79, Canadian politician, MPP of Ontario from Cambridge (1995–2011), cancer.
Anne Morrissy Merick, 83, American war correspondent and journalist, complications from dementia.
George Hugh Niederauer, 80, American Roman Catholic prelate, Archbishop of San Francisco (2006–2012), lung cancer.
A. R. Penck, 77, German artist, complications from a stroke.
Eduardo Portella, 84, Brazilian essayist, author and politician, Minister of Education (1979–1980).
Norma Procter, 89, English opera singer.
T. Gary Rogers, 74, American entrepreneur (Dreyer's).
Leo K. Thorsness, 85, American air force officer and Medal of Honor recipient, member of the Washington Senate (1988–1992), leukemia.
Romeo Vasquez, 78, Filipino actor, stroke.
Moray Watson, 88, British actor (The Darling Buds of May, The Quatermass Experiment, Compact).
Barry Wood, 74, South African Roman Catholic prelate, Auxiliary Bishop of Durban (since 2005).
Grigori Zhislin, 71, Russian violinist.

3
Mishaal bin Abdulaziz Al Saud, 90, Saudi prince, Governor of Mecca (1963–1971), Minister of Defense (1951–1953).
Lukas Ammann, 104, Swiss actor (Graf Yoster, Die Fallers – Eine Schwarzwaldfamilie, Meschugge), complications from surgery.
John Bjørnebye, 76, Norwegian diplomat, ambassador to Japan (1994–1999) and Belgium (2001–2006).
Alma W. Byrd, 92, American politician, member of the South Carolina House of Representatives (1991–1998).
Godfrey Chidyausiku, 70, Zimbabwean judge and politician, complications from cancer.
Georgie Collins, 91, Canadian actress (Ghostkeeper) and stage director.
Attila Császár, 58, Hungarian sprint canoer, world championship bronze medalist (1983).
John Foruria, 72, American football player (Pittsburgh Steelers).
Paul Hanneman, 80, American politician, member of the Oregon House of Representatives (1965–1990).
Charles Hoffer, 87, American music educator and author.
Casey Jones, 77, American blues drummer, cancer.
Daliah Lavi, 74, Israeli actress (Casino Royale, The Spy with a Cold Nose, Catlow), singer and model.
Hugh Marjoribanks, 83, Aussie cricketer.
Pat Marsh, 83, British ice hockey administrator.
Giampaolo Medda, 89, Italian Olympic hockey player.
Papillon, 26, Irish racehorse, winner of the 2000 Grand National.
Eva Pfarrhofer, 88, Austrian Olympic diver.
Doug Rollerson, 63, New Zealand rugby player (Manawatu, national team), cancer.
Bengt Rosén, 81, Swedish politician, MP (1985–1994).
Abbas Abdullahi Sheikh Siraji, 31, Somali politician, shot.
Irene Smart, 96, American politician and judge.
Yumeji Tsukioka, 94, Japanese actress (The Temptress and the Monk), pneumonia.

4
Joseph Barnes, 102, Irish physician.
William Baumol, 95, American economist.
Bart Carlier, 87, Dutch footballer (Fortuna Sittard).
Jay Carty, 75, American basketball player (Los Angeles Lakers) and evangelist, cancer.
Milena Čelesnik, 83, Slovenian Olympic athlete.
Richard Dalby, 68, British ghost story editor, scholar and bookseller, diabetic ketoacidosis.
William A. Davis Jr., 89, American engineer.
François Gagnon, 95, Canadian politician.
C. Jackson Grayson, 93, American businessman and writer.
Glenna Sue Kidd, 83, American baseball player (South Bend Blue Sox).
Victor Lanoux, 80, French actor (Cousin Cousine), complications from a stroke.
D.G.H. Latzko, 93, Dutch mechanical engineer.
Stephen McKenna, 78, British artist.
Timo Mäkinen, 79, Finnish racing driver (World Rally Championship).
Satsorupavathy Nathan, 80, Sri Lankan radio personality.
Ruwen Ogien, 67, French philosopher.
Richard Pennington, 69, American police officer, Superintendent of the New Orleans Police Department (1994–2002).
Rosie Scott, 69, New Zealand author, brain tumour.
Edwin Sherin, 87, American director and producer (Law & Order, The Great White Hope).
*Beryl Te Wiata, 92, New Zealand actress (My Letter to George, Xena: Warrior Princess).

5
Clive Brooks, 67, British drummer (Egg, The Groundhogs, Pink Floyd).
Buhe, 91, Chinese politician, Chairman of Inner Mongolia (1982–1993).
Binyamin Elon, 62, Israeli politician and rabbi, Minister of Tourism (2001–2002; 2003–2004) and member of Knesset (1996–2009), complications from throat cancer.
Corinne Erhel, 50, French politician, member of the National Assembly (since 2007), heart attack.
Amancio Escapa Aparicio, 79, Spanish-born Dominican Republic Roman Catholic prelate, Auxiliary Bishop of Santo Domingo (1996–2016).
Almir Guineto, 70, Brazilian sambista, kidney disease and diabetes.
Adolph Kiefer, 98, American swimmer, Olympic champion (1936).
Bernard Mitton, 62, South African tennis player.
Tommy Neck, 78, American football player (Chicago Bears).
Quinn O'Hara, 76, Scottish-born American actress (The Ghost in the Invisible Bikini).
Leila Seth, 86, Indian judge, Chief Justice of the Himachal Pradesh High Court (1991–1992), cardio-respiratory arrest.
Rekha Sindhu, 22, Indian actress, traffic collision.
*Ely Ould Mohamed Vall, 64, Mauritanian politician, President (2005–2007), heart attack.
Michael Wearing, 78, British television producer (Edge of Darkness).
Michael Zwack, 67, American painter and sculptor, lung cancer.

6
Youssef Anis Abi-Aad, 77, Syrian Maronite hierarch, Archbishop of Aleppo (1997–2013).
Richard Battey, 87, American federal judge, U.S. District Court for the District of South Dakota (1985–1999).
John Bennison, 92, Australian businessman (Wesfarmers).
Tony Conwell, 85, English footballer (Derby County, Huddersfield Town, Doncaster Rovers).
Jesús Galdeano, 85, Spanish racing cyclist.
Tommy Henaughan, 86, American-born Scottish footballer (Kilmarnock, Brentford, Greenock Morton).
Steven Holcomb, 37, American bobsledder, Olympic champion (2010), pulmonary edema.
Val Jellay, 89, Australian actress (The Flying Doctors, Prisoner, Homicide), pneumonia.
Rais Khan, 77, Pakistani sitarist.
Peter Kivy, 82, American musicologist, cancer.
Grzegorz Kosma, 60, Polish Olympic handball player (1980).
Mihir Kumar Nandi, 71, Bangladeshi Rabindra Sangeet singer, cancer.
Peter Noble, 72, English footballer (Swindon Town, Burnley).
*Peng Shaoyi, 99, Chinese physical chemist.
Manuel Rodriguez Sr., 105, Filipino printmaker.
John Schultz, 84, American writer.
Marshall Julum Shakya, 76, Nepalese politician, complications from pneumonia, heart failure and septic shock.
Min Bahadur Sherchan, 85, Nepalese mountaineer, suspected heart attack.
Vasily Tarasyuk, 68, Russian politician, drowned.
Henry Tempest, 93, English landowner (Broughton Hall), kidney failure.
Jack Tilton, 66, American art dealer, cancer.
Yves Velan, 91, French-born Swiss writer.

7
Yoshimitsu Banno, 86, Japanese director, cameraman and writer (Godzilla vs. Hedorah, Throne of Blood, The Bad Sleep Well), subarachnoid hemorrhage.
Auguste Batina, 81, Congolese politician.
Levon Panos Dabağyan, 83, Turkish writer and historian.
Eivind Eckbo, 89, Norwegian politician, leader of Anders Lange's Party (1974–1975).
Louise Emanuel, 63, South African-born British child psychotherapist.
Peter T. Flawn, 91, American geologist and educator, President of University of Texas at Austin (1979–1985, 1997–1998).
Gran Apache, 58, Mexican professional wrestler (AAA), intestinal cancer.
Mahendra Gupte, 86, Indian cricket umpire.
Eduard Gutiérrez, 21, Colombian footballer (Atlético Huila), traffic collision.
Elon Lages Lima, 87, Brazilian mathematician.
Beppo Mauhart, 83, Austrian executive.
Bob Mimm, 92, American Olympic racewalker (1960), prostate cancer.
Rod Monroe, 40, American football player (Cleveland Browns, Atlanta Falcons), heart attack.
Chuck Orsborn, 99, American college basketball coach and athletic administrator (Bradley Braves).
Gholamreza Pahlavi, 93, Iranian prince.
Dave Pell, 92, American jazz saxophonist.
John Stroppa, 91, Canadian football player (Winnipeg Blue Bombers).
Richard Summers, 95, British RAF air observer during the Battle of Britain.
Hugh Thomas, Baron Thomas of Swynnerton, 85, British historian and life peer.
Hubertus Antonius van der Aa, 81, Dutch mycologist.
Svend Wam, 71, Norwegian director (Lasse & Geir).
Lee Weissenborn, 88, American politician.
Thomas A. White, 85, Irish Roman Catholic prelate, Apostolic Nuncio (1978–1996).
*Wu Wenjun, 97, Chinese mathematician and academician.

8
Faqir Aizazuddin, 81, Pakistani cricketer.
Cécile DeWitt-Morette, 94, French mathematician and physicist.
Dennis H. Farber, 71, American painter and photographer, complications from lung cancer and diabetes.
George Irvine, 69, American basketball player (Virginia Squires) and coach (Indiana Pacers, Detroit Pistons), cancer.
Stefania Jabłońska, 96, Polish cancer researcher.
Curt Lowens, 91, German-born American actor (Werewolf in a Girls' Dormitory, The Hindenburg, Angels & Demons) and Holocaust survivor, fall.
Allan H. Meltzer, 89, American economist.
J. David Molson, 88, Canadian business executive (Molson Brewery), president of the Montreal Canadiens (1964–1972).
Lou Richards, 94, Australian footballer (Collingwood).
Ulugbek Ruzimov, 48, Uzbekistani footballer (Pakhtakor Tashkent), cirrhosis.
Lawson Soulsby, Baron Soulsby of Swaffham Prior, 90, British microbiologist and life peer, Member of the House of Lords (1990–2015).
Nicolas Stacey, 89, English Olympic clergyman (1952).
Judith Stein, 77, American historian, lung cancer.
James S. Sutterlin, 95, American diplomat.
Juan Carlos Tedesco, 73, Argentine politician, Minister of Education (2007–2009).
Mary Tsoni, 29, Greek actress (Dogtooth) and singer, pulmonary edema.
Peter Vogel, 80, German artist.
Clarence Williams, 70, American football player (Green Bay Packers).

9
Hussein Ali Abdulle, 71, Somali football player and manager (national team).
Ron Atkey, 75, Canadian lawyer and politician, MP and Minister of Employment and Immigration (1979–1980).
Armando Baptista-Bastos, 83, Portuguese author and journalist.
Brian James Barnes, 84, Australian-born Papuan Roman Catholic prelate, Bishop of Aitape (1987–1997) and Archbishop of Port Moresby (1997–2008).
Christopher Boykin, 45, American entertainer and musician (Rob & Big), heart failure.
Sal Cuevas, 62, American bassist.
John Kivela, 47, American businessman and politician, member of the Michigan House of Representatives (since 2013), suicide by hanging.
Zoran Madžirov, 49, Macedonian percussionist, traffic collision.
Mathieu Maes, 73, Belgian cyclist.
Jean Mailland, 80, French film director and author.
Robert Miles, 47, Swiss-born Italian electronic dance musician and record producer ("Children"), cancer.
Arthur Moulin, 92, French politician, member of the National Assembly (1958–1973) and Senate (1983–1992).
Michael Parks, 77, American actor (Twin Peaks, From Dusk till Dawn, Kill Bill).
Qian Qichen, 89, Chinese diplomat, Foreign Minister (1988–1998) and Vice Premier (1993–2003).
Wilburn K. Ross, 94, American WWII veteran, Medal of Honor recipient.
John Valder, 85, Australian journalist and politician, kidney disease.
Edward Lunn Young, 96, American politician, member of the U.S. House of Representatives from South Carolina's 6th congressional district (1973–1975).

10
Fozia Anjum, 77, Pakistani radio broadcaster and poet.
Silvano Basagni, 78, Italian sport shooter, Olympic bronze medalist (1972).
Geoffrey Bayldon, 93, English actor (Catweazle, Worzel Gummidge, Casino Royale).
Emmanuèle Bernheim, 61, French author and screenwriter (Swimming Pool, 5x2).
Joy Byers, 82, American songwriter ("Please Don't Stop Loving Me").
Eloise E. Clark, 85–86, American biologist, President of the American Association for the Advancement of Science (1994).
Bill Ebery, 91, Australian politician, member of the Victorian Legislative Assembly (1973–1983).
Greg Forristall, 67, American politician, member of the Iowa House of Representatives (since 2007), cancer.
Colette Guillaumin, 83, French feminist.
Safet Halilović, 66, Bosnian politician, President of the Federation of Bosnia and Herzegovina (2002–2003).
Ted Hibberd, 91, Canadian ice hockey player, Olympic gold medalist (1948).
Douglas Netter, 95, American television producer (Babylon 5).
Rex Sanders, 94, British Royal Air Force officer.
Gordon Simpson, 87, Australian politician, member of the Queensland Legislative Assembly (1974–1989).
Gaisi Takeuti, 91, Japanese mathematician.
Nelson Xavier, 75, Brazilian actor (The Guns, A Queda), lung disease.

11
Alexander Bodunov, 65, Russian ice hockey player (Soviet national team), world champion (1973).
William David Brohn, 84, American music arranger and orchestrator (Ragtime, Oliver!, Wicked), Tony winner (1998).
Seaborn Buckalew Jr., 96, American jurist and politician, delegate to the Alaska constitutional convention, member of the Alaska House (1955–1959) and Senate (1960–1961).
Gabriel Chiramel, 102, Indian Roman Catholic priest, educationist, zoologist and author.
Mark Colvin, 65, British-born Australian journalist and radio presenter (PM), lung cancer.
Clelio Darida, 90, Italian politician, Mayor of Rome (1969–1976) and Minister of Justice (1981–1983).
John F. Donahue, 92, American businessman (Federated Investors).
İbrahim Erkal, 50, Turkish singer-songwriter, cerebral hemorrhage.
Nigel Forman, 74, British politician, MP for Carshalton and Wallington (1976–1997).
Roland Gräf, 82, German cinematographer, film director and screenwriter (The House on the River, Fallada: The Last Chapter, The Tango Player).
Elisabet Hermodsson, 89, Swedish artist and poet.
Caroline Hussey, 75, Irish microbiologist.
Yale Lary, 86, American football player (Detroit Lions), businessman and politician, member of the Texas House of Representatives (1959–1963).
Charles A. McClenahan, 76, American politician, member of the Maryland House of Delegates (1992–2003).
Simpson Mutambanengwe, 87, Zimbabwean-Namibian judge, renal failure.
Roger Sale, 84, American literary critic.
Galina Shergova, 93, Russian writer.
David Thomas, 74, Welsh Anglican prelate, Provincial Assistant Bishop of the Church in Wales.

12
Louis Boyer, 95, French politician, member of the Senate for Loiret (1974–2001) and mayor of Gien (1959–1995).
Antonio Candido, 98, Brazilian literary critic and sociologist.
Alain Colmerauer, 76, French computer scientist.
Bill Dowdy, 84, American jazz drummer (The Three Sounds).
Brendan Duddy, 80, Northern Irish property developer, political activist, and peace negotiator.
Michael Jackson, 48, American football player (Cleveland Browns, Baltimore Ravens) and politician, mayor of Tangipahoa, Louisiana (2009–2012), traffic collision.
Sally Jacobsen, 70, American journalist, first female international editor of the Associated Press, cancer.
Mauno Koivisto, 93, Finnish politician, President (1982–1994) and Prime Minister (1968–1970, 1979–1982), complications from Alzheimer's disease.
Henri Termeer, 71, Dutch-born American biotechnology executive (Genzyme).
George A. Thompson, 97, American geologist.
Yu So-chow, 86, Chinese actress, pneumonia.
Oleksandr Zadorozhnii, 57, Ukrainian lawyer, politician and scientist, member of Verkhovna Rada (1998–2006).
Amotz Zahavi, 89, Israeli evolutionary biologist.

13
Oliviero Beha, 68, Italian journalist.
Ron Bontemps, 90, American basketball player, Olympic gold medalist (1952).
Jimmy Copley, 63, English drummer (Jeff Beck, Graham Parker, Tears for Fears), leukaemia.
John Cygan, 63, American actor and comedian (The Commish, Metal Gear, Toy Story 3), cancer.
Yanko Daucik, 76, Czech footballer (Real Betis, Real Madrid).
Janet Lewis-Jones, 67, British executive (BBC Trust).
Nancy Oestreich Lurie, 93, American anthropologist.
Vera Martelli, 86, Italian Olympic sprinter (1952).
Rachid Natouri, 71, Algerian footballer (Metz, Troyes, national team).
Thomas H. Paterniti, 88, American politician, New Jersey Assemblyman (1980–1988) and Senator (1988–1992).
Marcel Pelletier, 89, Canadian ice hockey player (Chicago Blackhawks, New York Rangers) and scout (Boston Bruins).
Manuel Pradal, 53, French film director and screenwriter (A Crime, Ginostra, Marie from the Bay of Angels).
Len Rohde, 79, American football player (San Francisco 49ers).
Eberhard Spiecker, 85, German clergyman.
Nicholas Tarling, 86, British-born New Zealand historian, academic (University of Auckland) and author.

14
Dilbagh Singh Athwal, 89, Indian geneticist and agriculturist.
Edmund Bagwell, 50, British cartoonist (Judge Dredd, Nick Fury), pancreatic cancer.
Powers Boothe, 68, American actor (Tombstone, Deadwood, Red Dawn), Emmy winner (1980), heart attack due to pancreatic cancer.
Frank Brian, 94, American basketball player (Fort Wayne Pistons).
Bill Cox, 88, American football player (Washington Redskins).
Thomas Vose Daily, 89, American Roman Catholic prelate, Bishop of Brooklyn (1990–2003).
Abdullah Nimar Darwish, 69, Israeli political activist and religious leader, founder of Islamic Movement in Israel.
Chuck Davis, 80, American dancer and choreographer (DanceAfrica).
Alain Defossé, 60, French novelist and translator.
Jean Fritz, 101, American children's writer.
Brad Grey, 59, American producer (The Departed, Charlie and the Chocolate Factory, The Sopranos), chairman and CEO of Paramount Pictures (2005–2017), cancer.
Bruce Hill, 67, American racing driver, esophageal cancer.
Tom McClung, 60, American jazz pianist and composer, cancer.
Steve Palermo, 67, American baseball umpire and supervisor, lung cancer.
Silvan S. Schweber, 89, French-born American physicist and science historian.
Peter W. Smith, 81, American investment banker and political operative.

15
Karl-Otto Apel, 95, German philosopher.
Herbert R. Axelrod, 89, American ichthyologist and musical instrument collector.
Graeme Barrow, 80, Australian author.
*Chu Ke-liang, 70, Taiwanese actor (The New Legend of Shaolin, David Loman, The Wonderful Wedding) and comedian, liver failure.
Felipe Ehrenberg, 73, Mexican artist, professor and publisher.
Karlene Faith, 79, Canadian criminologist, aortic aneurysm.
François Fortassin, 77, French politician, Senator (since 2001).
Nasser Givehchi, 85, Iranian wrestler, Olympic silver medalist (1952).
Koryne Kaneski Horbal, 80, American feminist and political activist, heart failure.
Stan Kaluznick, 85, Canadian football player (Calgary Stampeders).
Thomas James Kinsman, 72, American soldier, Medal of Honor recipient.
Takeshi Kusaka, 86, Japanese actor.
Bob Kuzava, 93, American baseball player (New York Yankees, Chicago White Sox, Washington Senators).
Al Lawrence, 86, Australian long-distance runner, Olympic bronze medalist (1956).
Ulrich Libbrecht, 88, Belgian philosopher.
S. Ramassamy, 77, Indian politician, Chief Minister of Puducherry (1974, 1977–1978).
Neil Rolde, 85, American historian and politician, member of the Maine House of Representatives (1974–1990).
David Saul, 77, Bermudian politician, Premier of Bermuda (1995–1997).
*Javier Valdez Cárdenas, 50, Mexican reporter (Ríodoce, La Jornada), shot.
Oleg Vidov, 73, Russian-American actor (Red Heat, Wild Orchid, Thirteen Days), complications from cancer.

16
Roy Ackerman, 75, English restaurateur (The Gay Hussar).
Bernard Bosson, 69, French politician, Minister of Transport, Tourism and Public Works (1993–1995).
Alain Casabona, 66, French author.
Ronnie Cocks, 73, Maltese footballer (Sliema Wanderers, national team).
Julian Abele Cook Jr., 86, American federal judge, U.S. District Court for the Eastern District of Michigan (1978–1996).
Eleanor Kieliszek, 91, American politician, Mayor of Teaneck, New Jersey (1974–1978, 1990–1992).
Anne Kimbell, 84, American actress (Monster from the Ocean Floor).
Walter Kollmann, 84, Austrian footballer (Wacker Wien).
Oleksiy Kruhliak, 41, Ukrainian Olympic fencer.
Megan Lowe, 101, English cricketer (national team).
Gunnar Möller, 88, German actor (I Often Think of Piroschka).
Outi Ojala, 70, Finnish politician, MEP (1996–1999), member of the Parliament of Finland (1991–1996, 1999–2007), President of the Nordic Council (2001–2002).
Glenn L. Pace, 77, American religious leader, general authority of the LDS Church (since 1985).
Doug Somers, 65, American professional wrestler (AWA).
Rosa Speer, 94, American gospel singer (Speer Family).
Emilio Lorenzo Stehle, 90, German-born Ecuadorian Roman Catholic prelate, Bishop of Santo Domingo de los Colorados (1987–2002).
James Zavitz, 94, Canadian Olympic sports shooter.

17
Aristeidis Alafouzos, 93, Greek shipping and media mogul.
Michael Bliss, 76, Canadian historian and biographer (Frederick Banting, William Osler, Harvey Cushing).
Roxcy Bolton, 90, American civil rights activist and feminist, founder of Women in Distress.
Faruq Ahmed Choudhury, 84, Bangladeshi diplomat, Foreign Secretary (1984–1986), High Commissioner to India (1986–1992).
Raúl Córdoba, 93, Mexican footballer (Club Atlas, national team).
Liebe Sokol Diamond, 86, American pediatric orthopedic surgeon, lymphoma.
Eustace Gibbs, 3rd Baron Wraxall, 87, British diplomat and aristocrat.
Viktor Gorbatko, 82, Russian cosmonaut (Soyuz 7, 24 and 37).
Firuz Kazemzadeh, 92, Russian-born American historian.
Rhodri Morgan, 77, British politician, MP for Cardiff West (1987–2001), Leader of Welsh Labour (2000–2009) and First Minister (2000–2009).
Tor Morisse, 69, Norwegian children's author and cartoonist.
Moji Olaiya, 42, Nigerian actress (Apaadi), cardiac arrest.
David A Ramey, 78, American artist.
Gerhard Schreiber, 76, German military historian.
Alan Swinbank, 72, British racehorse trainer.
Unusual Heat, 27, American racehorse, euthanized.
Todor Veselinović, 86, Serbian football player and manager (FK Vojvodina, Fenerbahçe, Yugoslavia national team), Olympic silver medalist (1956).

18
Roger Ailes, 77, American television executive, Chairman and CEO of Fox News (1996–2016), subdural hematoma.
Vadim Chernobrov, 51, Russian paranormal investigator.
Chris Cornell, 52, American musician and songwriter (Soundgarden, Audioslave, Temple of the Dog), suicide by hanging.
Dai Zijin, 101, Chinese WWII aviator (Flying Tigers).
Anil Madhav Dave, 60, Indian politician, MP (since 2009), Minister of Environment, Forest and Climate Change (since 2016), cardiac arrest.
Volodymyr Dudarenko, 71, Ukrainian football player (CSKA Moscow) and manager (SKA Lviv).
Dame Di Ellis, 79, British rower.
Jacque Fresco, 101, American futurist.
Reema Lagoo, 58, Indian actress (Hum Aapke Hain Koun..!, Maine Pyar Kiya, Kal Ho Naa Ho), heart attack.
José Mercado Luna, 88, Mexican Olympic footballer (1948).
Jim McElreath, 89, American race car driver.
Tatsuya Nōmi, 47, Japanese actor (Gosei Sentai Dairanger).
Olev Olesk, 96, Estonian politician, Minister of Foreign Affairs in exile (1990–1992).
Frankie Paul, 51, Jamaican singer, kidney failure.
Daniele Piombi, 83, Italian television and radio presenter.
Erwin Potts, 85, American businessman (McClatchy).
Tor Fredrik Rasmussen, 91, Norwegian geographer.
Eric Stevenson, 74, Scottish footballer (Hibernian), cancer.
John Thompson, 88, British journalist and radio director (Independent Broadcasting Authority).

19
Alex. E.K. Ashiabor, 86, Ghanaian economist, Governor of the Bank of Ghana (1977–1983).
Donald Avenson, 72, American politician, member of the Iowa House of Representatives (1979–1989).
André Bach, 73, French general and historian.
Chana Bloch, 77, American poet, cancer.
Peter Bonsall-Boone, 78, Australian LGBT rights activist, cancer.
Rich Buckler, 68, American comic book artist (Deathlok, All-Star Squadron, Fantastic Four), cancer.
Judy Burton, 69, American educationalist.
David Bystroň, 34, Czech footballer (Baník Ostrava), suicide by hanging.
John Cavell, 100, British Anglican prelate, Bishop of Southampton (1972–1984).
Ben Cherski, 87, Canadian ice hockey player.
Grady C. Cothen, 96, American religious leader and academic administrator, President of Oklahoma Baptist University (1966–1970).
Corbett Cresswell, 84, English footballer (Carlisle United F.C.).
Hubertus Ernst, 100, Dutch Roman Catholic prelate, Bishop of Breda (1967–1992).
Jan Fontein, 89, Dutch art historian.
Stanley Greene, 68, American photojournalist, cancer.
Roger Haudegand, 85, French Olympic basketball player (1952,1956).
Kid Vinil, 62, Brazilian singer and record producer.
Herbert L. Meschke, 89, American politician and judge, Justice on the North Dakota Supreme Court (1985–1998), member of the North Dakota House of Representatives (1965–1966) and Senate (1967–1970).
Ed Mierkowicz, 93, American baseball player (Detroit Tigers).
Nawshirwan Mustafa, 72, Iraqi Kurdish politician, general coordinator of the Movement for Change, lung cancer.
Stanislav Petrov, 77, Russian Lieutenant colonel in the Soviet Air Defense Forces, hypostatic pneumonia.
Tommy Ross, 71, Scottish footballer (York City).
David Sánchez, 25, Mexican flyweight boxer, traffic collision.
Reidar Torp, 94, Norwegian military officer.
Mário Viegas Carrascalão, 80, East Timorese politician, Governor of East Timor during the Indonesian occupation (1982–1992).
Wayne Walker, 80, American football player (Detroit Lions), sports broadcaster and director (KPIX, NFL on CBS), complications from Parkinson's disease.
Steve Waterbury, 65, American baseball player (St. Louis Cardinals).

20
Recep Adanır, 88, Turkish footballer (Beşiktaş J.K.).
Albert Bouvet, 87, French racing cyclist.
Joy Corning, 84, American politician, Lieutenant Governor of Iowa (1991–1999), liver illness.
Jimmy Dale, 81, British-born Canadian musician.
Emile Degelin, 90, Belgian film director (If the Wind Frightens You, Life and Death in Flanders).
Paul Falk, 95, German figure skater, Olympic Champion (1952).
Victor Găureanu, 49, Romanian Olympic fencer (1992, 2000), world championship bronze medalist (1994, 2001).
Claude Hipps, 90, American football player (Pittsburgh Steelers).
Syed Abdullah Khalid, 75, Bangladeshi sculptor, complications from COPD.
Abdul Rahim Khan Mandokhel, 84, Pakistani politician.
Noel Kinsey, 91, Welsh footballer (Birmingham City).
Jayne Millington, 55, British RAF officer.
Miguel Mykycej, 82, Ukrainian-born Argentine Ukrainian Catholic hierarch, Bishop of Santa María del Patrocinio in Buenos Aires (1999–2010).
William Clifford Newman, 88, American Roman Catholic prelate, Auxiliary Bishop of Baltimore (1984–2003).
Michael Rank, 67, English journalist and translator.
Jean E. Sammet, 89, American computer scientist.
Natalia Shakhovskaya, 81, Russian cellist.
Lisa Spoonauer, 44, American actress (Clerks), accidental hydromorphone overdose.
Roger Tassé, 85, Canadian civil servant, architect of the Canadian Charter of Rights and Freedoms.
Alexander Alexandrovich Volkov, 65, Russian politician, President of the Udmurt Republic (2000–2014).
James Weatherhead, 86, Scottish minister, Moderator of the General Assembly of the Church of Scotland (1993–1994).

21
Kenny Cordray, 62, American guitarist and songwriter, shot.
Andrew Dallmeyer, 72, Scottish playwright and actor (Eliza Graves).
Sir Paul Judge, 68, British businessman (Cadbury Schweppes, Premier Brands, Standard Bank) and political executive.
Shulamit Kishik-Cohen, 100, Argentine-born Israeli spy.
Jimmy LaFave, 61, American folk singer, songwriter and guitarist, cancer.
Sir Peter Marychurch, 89, British intelligence officer, Director of GCHQ (1983–1989).
Tulsa Pittaway, 42, South African musician (Watershed), traffic collision.
Philippa Roles, 39, Welsh Olympic discus thrower (2004, 2008).
Wayne Simoneau, 82, American politician.
Lars-Erik Skiöld, 65, Swedish wrestler, Olympic bronze medalist (1980).
Bill White, 77, Canadian ice hockey player (Chicago Blackhawks, Los Angeles Kings, national team).
Larry Wright, 77, American cartoonist (The Detroit News).

22
Graham Ayliffe, 91, English medical microbiologist.
Barry Azzopardi, 70, British chemical engineer, cancer.
William Carney, 74, American politician, member of the U.S. House of Representatives from New York's 1st congressional district (1979–1987), prostate cancer.
Chan Yuk-shee, 72–73, Hong Kong economist and academic administrator, President of Lingnan University (2007–2013).
Barbara Smith Conrad, 79, American opera singer.
Manuel de Seabra, 85, Portuguese writer.
Devil His Due, 28, American racehorse, euthanized.
Oscar Fulloné, 78, Argentine football player and coach.
John Gerard-Pearse, 93, British rear admiral.
Gérard Girouard, 84, Canadian politician, lawyer and professor of law.
Nicky Hayden, 35, American motorcycle racer, world champion (2006), injuries from traffic collision.
Denys Johnson-Davies, 94, English translator.
Viktor Kupreichik, 67, Belarusian chess grandmaster.
Helen Kwalwasser, 89, American violin soloist and teacher.
Giovanni Lombardi, 90, Swiss civil engineer.
Dina Merrill, 93, American actress (Operation Petticoat, BUtterfield 8, Desk Set), heiress and socialite, dementia.
Leonhard Nagenrauft, 79, German Olympic luger (1968, 1972), European champion (1967).
Vladimir Pereturin, 78, Russian football player and TV commentator.
Mickey Roker, 84, American jazz drummer, lung cancer.
Zbigniew Wodecki, 67, Polish singer, composer and musician.

23
Olivier de Berranger, 78, French Roman Catholic prelate, Bishop of Saint-Denis (1996–2009).
Roger Boesche, 69, American political theorist.
Charles Kofi Bucknor, 64, Ghanaian actor (Run Baby Run).
Alexander Burdonsky, 75, Russian theatre director, cancer.
Chandraswami, 66, Indian religious advisor, stroke.
Stefano Farina, 54, Italian football referee (UEFA Champions League).
Ben Finney, 83, American anthropologist.
Ernst Gebendinger, 91, Swiss gymnast, Olympic silver medalist (1952).
Denise Guénard, 83, French Olympic athlete (1952, 1960, 1964).
Cortez Kennedy, 48, American Hall of Fame football player (Seattle Seahawks).
Peter Lawler, 65, American political scientist.
Sir Roger Moore, 89, English actor (The Spy Who Loved Me, Maverick, The Saint), cancer.
Viorel Morariu, 85, Romanian rugby union player, Vernon Pugh Award for Distinguished Service recipient.
Jerry Perenchio, 86, American businessman (Univision) and producer (Blade Runner), lung cancer.
Sonny Randle, 81, American football player (St. Louis Cardinals, San Francisco 49ers).
Robert Thalmann, 68, Swiss bicycle racer, heart attack.
Patrick van Rensburg, 85, South African educationalist and anti-apartheid activist.
Neville Wigram, 2nd Baron Wigram, 101, British Army officer.
Kaoru Yosano, 78, Japanese politician, Chief Cabinet Secretary (2007).

24
Ezekiel Anisi, 28, Papua New Guinean politician, MP for Ambunti-Dreikikir (2012, since 2013).
Giovanni Bignami, 73, Italian astrophysicist, heart attack.
Ann Birstein, 89, American writer.
David Bobin, 71, British sports broadcaster (Sky Sports).
George Chesworth, 86, British Royal Air Force officer and Lord Lieutenant of Moray (1994–2005).
Tom Gilbey, 79, British fashion designer, cancer.
Claudia Hellmann, 93, German opera singer.
William Duborgh Jensen, 82, Norwegian fashion designer.
Denis Johnson, 67, American author (Jesus' Son, Tree of Smoke, Angels), liver cancer.
Bata Kameni, 75, Serbian actor and stunt performer.
Paul Keetch, 56, British politician, MP for Hereford (1997–2010).
Juliana Young Koo, 111, Chinese-born American diplomat.
Jared Martin, 75, American actor (Dallas, War of the Worlds, Aenigma), pancreatic cancer.
Grace McCarthy, 89, Canadian politician, MLA for Vancouver-Little Mountain (1975–1991), brain tumor.
Gil Portes, 71, Filipino film director (Saranggola, Small Voices, 'Merika).
Isabelle Rapin, 89, Swiss-born American neurologist, pneumonia.
Ross Rhoads, 84, American pastor (Charlotte Calvary Church, Southern Evangelical Seminary).
Pierre Seron, 75, Belgian comic book artist.
Sonny West, 78, American actor and stuntman (Stay Away, Joe, The Hellcats, Bigfoot), lung cancer.
Beranton Whisenant, 37, American federal prosecutor.

25
Mohammed Bawa, 67, Nigerian military officer and politician, administrator of Ekiti State (1996–1998) and Gombe State (1998–1999), complications from surgery.
Jean-Paul Chifflet, 67, French banker, Director General of Crédit Agricole (2010–2015), fall from tractor.
Marie Cosindas, 93, American photographer.
Gina Fratini, 85, British fashion designer.
Alexandros Goulandris, 90, Greek shipowner.
Siri Gunasinghe, 92, Sri Lankan author and filmmaker.
Robert E. Haebel, 89, American Marines major general.
Earl Hagaman, 91, American-born New Zealand hotel magnate.
Sir Alistair Horne, 91, British historian, journalist and spy.
Eliezer Jaffe, 83, American-born Israeli sociologist.
Eva Estrada Kalaw, 96, Filipino politician, Senator (1965–1972) and Assemblywoman from Manila (1984–1986).
Frédérick Leboyer, 98, French obstetrician and author.
Miguel Méndez, 74, American legal scholar.
Sister Joel Read, 91, American nun and academic administrator, president of Alverno College (1968–2003).
Saucy Sylvia, 96, Canadian-born American comedian and singer.
Ali Tanrıyar, 103, Turkish politician, Minister of the Interior (1983–1984) and sports executive, President of Galatasary S.K. (1986–1990).
Emili Vicente, 52, Spanish football player and coach (CF Reus Deportiu, FC Andorra), traffic collision.
Daniel Waley, 96, British historian.

26
Toni Bertorelli, 69, Italian actor (The Young Pope, The Passion of the Christ, Zora the Vampire).
Sabzar Bhat, Indian militant commander (Hizbul Mujahideen), shot.
Laura Biagiotti, 73, Italian fashion designer, heart attack.
Zbigniew Brzezinski, 89, Polish-born American diplomat and political scientist, National Security Advisor (1977–1981).
Jim Bunning, 85, American Hall of Fame baseball player (Detroit Tigers, Philadelphia Phillies) and politician, member of the U.S. House of Representatives (1987–1999) and U.S. Senator (1999–2011), complications from a stroke.
Robert Curtis, 27, American basketball player (Saint John Mill Rats), shot.
*Kanwar Pal Singh Gill, 82, Indian police officer, Director general of police for Punjab (1988–1990, 1991–1995).
Clytie Jessop, 87, Australian artist, actress and film director (Emma's War).
Manuel Mora y Araujo, 79, Argentine sociologist and political analyst.
Derek Neilson, 58, Scottish footballer (Brechin City, Berwick Rangers).
Robert J. Parins, 98, American judge and sports executive, President of the Green Bay Packers (1982–1989).
N. Periasamy, 78, Indian politician.
Philip Szanto, 81, American pathologist.
*Zhao Liping, 65, Chinese politician, police chief and convicted murderer, executed.

27
Gregg Allman, 69, American Hall of Fame singer-songwriter ("Whipping Post", "Midnight Rider") and musician (The Allman Brothers Band), liver cancer.
Kiran Ashar, 69, Indian cricketer.
Thomas Bridges, 2nd Baron Bridges, 89, British diplomat, Ambassador to Italy (1983–1987).
Fishel Hershkowitz, 94, Ukrainian-born American Hasidic rabbi.
Hyun Hong-choo, 76, South Korean diplomat, Ambassador to the United States (1991–1993).
Robert McCarley, 79, American psychiatrist and dream researcher.
Ludwig Preis, 45, German football coach (SpVgg Greuther Fürth).
Don Robinson, 84, English rugby league player (Wakefield Trinity, Leeds), world champion (1954).

28
Anthony Foster, 64, Australian activist for child sexual abuse victims of the Roman Catholic Church.
Ken Ackerman, 95, American radio announcer (KCBS).
Chris Brand, 74, British psychologist, hospital-acquired infection.
Eric Broadley, 88, British race car builder and founder of Lola Cars.
Elisabeth Chojnacka, 77, Polish harpsichordist (Xenakis Ensemble).
Frank Deford, 78, American sportswriter (Sports Illustrated), novelist and radio broadcaster (Morning Edition).
Maury Dexter, 89, American director and producer.
Ervin E. Dupper, 94, American politician, Member of the South Dakota Senate (1965–1968).
Marcus Intalex, 45, British disc jockey and record producer.
Lawrence Jenkins, 93, American World War II veteran and memoirist.
David E. Kuhl, 87, American scientist.
Werner Malitz, 90, German Olympic cyclist.
Hugh McCabe, 62, Northern Irish Gaelic football manager and player.
Benjamin Melendez, 65, American gang leader (Ghetto Brothers), complications from kidney disease.
Pat Mullins, 79, American politician, traffic collision.
Naison Ndlovu, 86, Zimbabwean politician, mayor of Bulawayo (1981–1985) and Deputy Senate President (2008–2013), prostate cancer.
John Noakes, 83, British television presenter (Blue Peter, Go With Noakes), Alzheimer's disease.
A. Vinayagamoorthy, 83, Sri Lankan politician, MP (2000–2004, 2010–2015).
Graham Webb, 73, British racing cyclist, road world champion (1967).
Yu Mingtao, 99, Chinese politician.

29
Michael A'Hearn, 76, American astronomer.
Enitan Bababunmi, 76, Nigerian academic, Vice-Chancellor of Lagos State University (1993–1996).
Tapan Banerjee, 73, Indian cricketer (Bengal).
Ramon Campos Jr., 92, Filipino Olympic basketball player (1948, 1952, 1956).
Abbott Lowell Cummings, 94, American architectural historian.
Bogdan Dochev, 80, Bulgarian football player and referee.
Barbara Jaruzelska, 86, Polish academic, First Lady (1985–1990).
David Lewiston, 88, British music collector, stroke.
Konstantinos Mitsotakis, 98, Greek politician, Prime Minister (1990–1993).
Manuel Noriega, 83, Panamanian dictator and military official, military ruler (1983–1989), complications from brain surgery.
Tony Rudd, 93, British stockbroker.
William J. L. Sladen, 96, Welsh naturalist.
Nikolay Tatarinov, 89, Russian modern pentathlete, Olympic silver medalist (1960).
Mordechai Tzipori, 92, Israeli general and politician, Minister of Communications (1981–1984).
Ananda Wedisinghe, 47, Sri Lankan motor cycle champion.

30
Sir Gordon Brunton, 95, British businessman.
Wendell Burton, 69, American actor (The Sterile Cuckoo, You're a Good Man, Charlie Brown, Heat), brain cancer.
Dibyo Previan Caesario, 24, Indonesian footballer (Persita Tangerang).
Ken Cooper, 80, American football player and coach (Georgia Bulldogs, Ole Miss Rebels).
Tom Graham, 67, American football player (Denver Broncos, San Diego Chargers), brain cancer.
Robert Hammond, 67, Ghanaian footballer (Hearts of Oak, national team).
Reinhold Hanning, 95, German Waffen-SS concentration camp guard and convicted war criminal.
George W. Johnson, 88, American academic, president of George Mason University (1978–1996), complications from a fall.
Daniel Kucera, 94, American Roman Catholic prelate, Archbishop of Dubuque (1983–1995).
José Carlos Melo, 86, Brazilian Roman Catholic prelate, Archbishop of Maceió (2002–2006).
Robert Michael Morris, 77, American actor (The Comeback, Running Wilde, How I Met Your Mother) and playwright.
Dominique Nohain, 91, French actor and theatre director.
Molly Peters, 75, British actress (Thunderball).
Dasari Narayana Rao, 75, Indian film director (Meghasandesam) and politician.
Valère Somé, 66, Burkinabé politician, scholar and revolutionary leader.
John Taylor, 75, British politician, MP for Solihull (1983–2005).
Bernt Torberntsson, 88, Swedish Olympic rower (1948, 1952).
Elena Verdugo, 92, American actress (Marcus Welby, M.D., House of Frankenstein, Panama Sal).

31
Jean-Marie Benoît Balla, 58, Cameroonian Roman Catholic prelate, Bishop of Bafia (since 2003).
Clifford Barker, 91, British Anglican prelate, Bishop of Selby (1983–1991).
Jiří Bělohlávek, 71, Czech conductor, cancer.
Mimi Heinrich, 80, Danish actress and writer.
Lubomyr Husar, 84, Ukrainian Ukrainian Catholic hierarch, Major Archbishop of Kyiv-Halych (2001–2011).
Tino Insana, 69, American actor (Three Amigos, Who's Harry Crumb?, Barnyard), cancer.
Lyn James, 87, Welsh-born Australian actress (The Young Doctors).
Mohamed Fadhel Khalil, Tunisian politician.
Fred J. Koenekamp, 94, American cinematographer (The Towering Inferno, Patton, The Amityville Horror), Oscar winner (1975).
Fred Kummerow, 102, American biochemist.
Susan B. Landau, 65, American producer (Cool Runnings, An Ideal Husband) and talent manager (Simon Beaufoy).
Jerry Martinson, 74, American-born Taiwanese Jesuit priest, heart attack.
John May, 67, American politician.
Bern Nix, 69, American jazz guitarist.
Parvathamma Rajkumar, 77, Indian film producer.
Margaret Ray, 83, Australian politician, member of the Victorian Legislative Assembly for Box Hill (1982–1992).
Louis Riecke, 90, American Olympic weightlifter.
Kathy Smith, 67–68, Australian politician, member of the New South Wales Legislative Assembly for Gosford (2015–2017), cancer.
István Szondy, 91, Hungarian modern pentathlete and horse rider, Olympic champion (1952).
Diane Torr, 68, Canadian drag king, brain tumour.

References

2017-05
 05